The 2011 Senior League World Series took place from August 14–20 in Bangor, Maine, United States. Hilo, Hawaii defeated Tyler, Texas in the championship game.

Teams

Results

Group A

Group B

Elimination Round

References

Senior League World Series
Senior League World Series
Senior League